Suzanne Greco (née DeLuca, born 1957/58) is an American businesswoman, who was the president and CEO of the Subway fast food chain, from January 2015 to June 2018. She is the sister of Fred DeLuca, the co-founder of the company.

Early life
She was born Suzanne DeLuca, the daughter of  Salvatore DeLuca and his wife Carmela DeLuca (née Ombres, daughter of Salvatore and Teresina Regasto Ombres).

She has a bachelor's degree in business administration from Sacred Heart University.

Career
Greco began working at Subway in 1973 and was running operations and research and development.

She is the sister of Fred DeLuca the co-founder, and took over in January 2015, as her brother had been ill with leukemia for two years (he died in September 2015). She became the CEO of Subway in January 2015, and retired on June 30, 2018, when she became a senior advisor to the company, and was succeeded by Trevor Haynes as CEO.

Personal life
She is married to Gary Greco, and they live in Woodbridge, Connecticut.

References

1950s births
Living people
Sacred Heart University alumni
American chief executives of food industry companies
American women chief executives
People from Woodbridge, Connecticut
American people of Italian descent
21st-century American women